The Adventures of Lucky Pierre: Director's Cut is a novel by Robert Coover, published in 2002. The title is the same as a 1961 nudie cutie film, and like the film, the novel is divided into multiple vignettes, starring the title character Pierre.

The subtitle is an allusion to the now widespread practice of releasing director's cuts in addition to final cuts. There is no director's cut for the film.

An alternate subtitle "Raw Footage," had been used until publication, including the advanced reading copies. Several reviews were published with the alternate subtitle, while illustrating the book cover with the final subtitle. See, for example, Publishers Weekly. See also Internet Archive.

Unlike the film, the novel has an overriding metafictional theme, driven by Pierre seeking to escape from fiction.

Excerpts

Lucky Pierre was written over a period of thirty years, with numerous excerpts published separately.

Three excerpts were published in :

 "Home Movies: Lucky Pierre and the Phantom Ass".
 "Lucky Pierre in the Bath".

Dedication
The novel was dedicated to "Saint Buster, Saint Luis, and Saint Jean-Luc.”  These are Buster Keaton, Luis Buñuel, Jean-Luc Godard, as is clear from a brief interview Coover gave in The New Yorker, where he mentioned the dedication, and said several of their films would be in his top fifty.

Organization
The novel is divided into nine chapters, called "reels". (The first chapter also includes the "titles".)  Each reel is named for the woman director who is controlling Pierre for that chapter. In the ninth reel, all nine women are present, parading in Greek costume, identifying themselves as the nine muses:

Reception

Further reading

References

2002 American novels
Novels based on films